Lil Peep was an American recording artist who released two studio albums, five mixtapes, and fourteen extended plays throughout his lifetime.

His studio album Come Over When You're Sober, Pt. 1 was released in August 2017 and peaked at number thirty-eight on the Billboard 200. The album spawned four singles: "Benz Truck (гелик)", "The Brightside", "Awful Things" and "Save That Shit". In January 2018, his first posthumous single "Spotlight" with Marshmello was released. It was then followed by "4 Gold Chains" with Clams Casino and "Falling Down" with fellow deceased rapper XXXTentacion in the same year. Shortly after, the original version was released, "Sunlight on Your Skin", with a verse featuring American rapper, iLoveMakonnen.

Peep's first posthumous project, Come Over When You're Sober, Pt. 2, was announced in October 2018 and was released on November 9, 2018. The project had three singles: "Cry Alone", "Runaway" and a remix of the song "Life", which was renamed "Life Is Beautiful". Both "Falling Down" and "Sunlight on Your Skin" were added as bonus tracks to the deluxe version of Come Over When You're Sober, Pt. 2.

Peep's second posthumous project, Everybody's Everything, released on November 15, 2019, the second anniversary of Peep's death. This album was also the official soundtrack to an accompanying documentary of the same name about the late Lil Peep's life. The album contained singles from regular collaborator, producer and friend BigHead, including a formal re-release of their hit "Witchblades" and an official release of "Liar" and "Aquafina" featuring Rich the Kid.

Albums

Studio albums

Compilation albums

Mixtapes

Extended plays

Singles

Other charted songs

Guest appearances

Notes

References

Discography
Discographies of American artists
Hip hop discographies